The following television stations operate on virtual channel 25 in the United States:

 K07AAF-D in Corsicana, Texas
 K16IR-D in Sayre, Oklahoma
 K17MK-D in Elk City, Oklahoma
 K23NH-D in Seiling, Oklahoma
 K25AD-D in Victorville, etc., California
 K25FP-D in Ellensburg, Washington
 K25GA-D in Redmond/Prineville, Oregon
 K25GK-D in Joshua Tree, California
 K25II-D in Redwood Falls, Minnesota
 K25KZ-D in Kalispell, Montana
 K25LG-D in Tyler, Texas
 K25LM-D in Great Falls, Montana
 K25LO-D in Hamilton, Montana
 K25LY-D in Fargo, North Dakota
 K25NG-D in St. Louis, Missouri
 K25QL-D in Chico, California
 K26ND-D in Hollis, Oklahoma
 K27OJ-D in El Paso, Texas
 K28KI-D in Roseburg, Oregon
 K33NV-D in Strong City, Oklahoma
 KAUN-LD in Sioux Falls, South Dakota
 KAVU-TV in Victoria, Texas
 KCKS-LD in Kansas City, Kansas
 KCKW-LD in Eugene, Oregon
 KCTL-LD in Livingston, Texas
 KDEN-TV in Longmont, Colorado
 KFDR in Jefferson City, Missouri
 KFLL-LD in Boise, Idaho
 KGCT-CD in Nowata, Oklahoma
 KHDE-LD in Laramie, Wyoming
 KJNK-LD in Minneapolis, Minnesota
 KJPO-LD in Parker, Arizona
 KKRA-LD in Rapid City, South Dakota
 KLFA-LD in Santa Maria, California
 KLPA-TV in Alexandria, Louisiana
 KMDE in Devils Lake, North Dakota
 KMJC-LD in Louisburg, Kansas
 KNDU in Richland, Washington
 KNET-CD in Los Angeles, California
 KOKH-TV in Oklahoma City, Oklahoma
 KPVM-LD in Las Vegas / Pahrump, Nevada
 KQDF-LD in Santa Fe, New Mexico
 KQET in Watsonville, California
 KQMK-LD in Lincoln, Nebraska
 KRRI-LD in Reno, Nevada
 KSVN-CD in Ogden, Utah
 KTEL-TV in Carlsbad, New Mexico
 KUTU-CD in Tulsa, Oklahoma
 KVTN-DT in Pine Bluff, Arkansas
 KXCO-LD in Refugio, Texas
 KXXV in Waco, Texas
 W19EY-D in Toa Baja, Puerto Rico
 W25DQ-D in Key West, Florida
 W25FR-D in Clarksburg, West Virginia
 W25FS-D in Clarksburg, West Virginia
 W25FX-D in Sutton, West Virginia
 W26DK-D in San Juan, Puerto Rico
 W31EZ-D in Chicago, Illinois
 W32FD-D in Louisa, Kentucky
 W34FP-D in Eastlake, Ohio
 WACS-TV in Dawson, Georgia
 WBQC-LD in Cincinnati, Ohio
 WCWW-LD in South Bend, Indiana
 WDMC-LD in Charlotte, North Carolina
 WDVM-TV in Hagerstown, Maryland
 WEDK-LD in Effingham, Illinois
 WEEK-TV in Peoria, Illinois
 WEHT in Evansville, Indiana
 WEYI-TV in Saginaw, Michigan
 WFXT in Boston, Massachusetts
 WHIQ in Huntsville, Alabama
 WJGV-CD in Palatka, Florida
 WJMY-CD in Tuscaloosa, Alabama
 WJXX in Orange Park, Florida
 WKAS in Ashland, Kentucky
 WKUT-LD in Bowling Green, Kentucky
 WLAX in La Crosse, Wisconsin
 WLMS-LD in Columbus, Mississippi
 WNYE-TV in New York, New York
 WOGC-CD in Holland, Michigan
 WOLO-TV in Columbia, South Carolina
 WPBF in Tequesta, Florida
 WPDP-CD in Cleveland, Tennessee
 WPHY-CD in Trenton, New Jersey
 WROB-LD in Topeka, Kansas
 WQIX-LD in Vidalia, Georgia
 WUNK-TV in Greenville, North Carolina
 WURH-CD in Miami, Florida
 WUSP-LD in Ponce, Puerto Rico
 WVAD-LD in Chesapeake, Virginia
 WVBG-LD in Greenwich, New York
 WVIZ in Cleveland, Ohio
 WXXV-TV in Gulfport, Mississippi
 WZDC-CD in Washington, D.C.

The following television stations, which are no longer licensed, formerly operated on virtual channel 25:
 K17LX-D in Bakersfield, California
 K25HD-D in Bullhead City, Arizona
 K25ND-D in Mount Vernon, Texas
 KLDT-LD in Lufkin, Texas
 KTUD-CD in Las Vegas, Nevada

References

25 virtual